References

Cilicia
Cities in Turkey